The VHS/Beta Yesterday Once More was released in 1985, shortly after Karen Carpenter's death in 1983. The tape was repackaged as a DVD in 2002 under the name Gold: Greatest Hits, and the DVD contains all the videos from Yesterday Once More.

Track list

Extra tracks
On a Japanese release of the DVD, the promotional video for "I Need to Be in Love" was included.

Certifications and sales

References

The Carpenters video albums